The 32nd Pennsylvania House of Representatives District is in southwestern Pennsylvania, located entirely in Allegheny County. It has been vacant since the death of Tony DeLuca on October 9, 2022.

District profile 
The 32nd Pennsylvania House of Representatives District is located in Allegheny County and includes the following areas:

Oakmont
 Penn Hills Township
 Plum (part)
District 01 
District 02 
District 03 
District 07 
District 17 
District 18 
District 19 
District 20 
District 21
 Verona

Representatives

Recent election results

References

External links 

 District map from the United States Census Bureau
 Pennsylvania House Legislative District Maps from the Pennsylvania Redistricting Commission.
 Population Data for District 32 from the Pennsylvania Redistricting Commission.

Government of Allegheny County, Pennsylvania
32